Michael G. Long is a former Associate Professor of Religious Studies and Peace and Conflict Studies at Elizabethtown College.

Career 
Long is the author or editor of books on civil rights, religion, and politics, including Jackie Robinson: A Spiritual Biography; Gay Is Good: The Life and Letters of Gay Rights Pioneer Franklin Kameny; Beyond Home Plate: Jackie Robinson on Life after Baseball; Martin Luther King, Jr., Homosexuality, and the Early Gay Rights Movement; and Marshalling Justice: The Early Civil Rights Letters of Thurgood Marshall. 

Long's first book on Jackie Robinson was selected as a best book of the year by Publishers Weekly. Long served as an expert historian for Ken Burns's documentary on Jackie Robinson.

Long has written for the Los Angeles Times, the Chicago Tribune, USA Today, the Afro, the Huffington Post, the Chicago Sun-Times, New York Daily News, and the Pittsburgh Post-Gazette, and his work has been featured or reviewed in or on NPR, The New York Times, the Washington Post, the Los Angeles Times, the Boston Globe, USA Today, Salon, CNN, Book Forum, Ebony/Jet, and other newspapers and journals. 

Long lives in Lower Allen Township (PA) with Karin, Jackson, and Nate. He received a Ph.D from Emory University in 2000.

 Selected works Against Us, But for Us: Martin Luther King Jr., and the State, Mercer University Press 2002, Martin Luther King Jr. on Create Living, Chalice Press 2004, Billy Graham and the Beloved Community: America's Evangelist and the Dream of Martin Luther King, Jr., Palgrave Macmillan 2006, God and Country: Diverse Perspectives on Christianity and Patriotism, Palgrave Macmillan 2007, First Class Citizenship: The Civil Rights Letters of Jackie Robinson, Times Books 2007, The Legacy of Billy Graham: Critical Reflections on America's Great Evangelist, Westminster John Knox Press 2008, I Must Resist: Bayard Rustin's Life in Letters (editor), City Lights 2012, Peaceful Neighbor: Discovering the Countercultural Mister Rogers, Westminster John Knox Press 2015, We the Resistance: Documenting a History of Nonviolent Protest in the United States, (City Lights, 2019) 
 Troublemaker for Justice: The Story of Bayard Rustin, the Man Behind the March on Washington, (City Lights, 2019) 
 Race Man: Selected Works, 1960-2015'' (editor), City Lights Publishers 2020

References

External links 

Year of birth missing (living people)
Living people
Elizabethtown College faculty
Emory University alumni